Rafel Tona (24 June 1903, Barcelona-12 February 1987, Paris) was a Catalan painter. His father was a lawyer and vice-president of the regional government of Catalonia.

Education
Tona attended the School of Art in Barcelona in 1917, where he studied drawing, painting and sculpture with the sculptor Josep Llimona. In 1923, during a stay in Paris, he attended painting classes at the "Académie Charpentier".

Work
In 1920 Tona worked in the studio of the sculptor Pau Gargallo and created drawings for the satirical newspaper Papitu.

Tona, along with Catalan painter Alfred Figueras, moved to Algiers in 1925 and established an Arts Academy where they taught painting, sculpture and drawing. In 1928 he returned to Paris spent his time painting and working on the movie sets in Joinville’s studios, where he helped create the sets for Pagnol and Korda's Marius and Pabst's L'Opéra de quat'sous.

Spanish Civil War and World War 2

After the Second Republic was proclaimed in Spain in 1932, Tona returned to Barcelona and opened an advertising agency. Around 1936 he was actively contributing to the republican movement by drawing propaganda posters. In 1939 he became a refugee from the Spanish Civil War and returned to France before moving on to Algeria after Germany's invasion.

In Algiers, Tona was dedicated to the Resistance and participated in the organisation of the Allies' landings in 1942. Along with painter Louis Bernasconi he set up the "Salons de la Résistance" in North Africa to raise money for the movement. He also contributed to the newspaper Combat and the Allies' propaganda (with posters and flyers). It was at this time that Tona established strong friendships with Albert Camus, René Capitant, Max-Pol Fouchet, René-Jean Clot, Jean Brune and Jean Amrouche.

Later life

From 1944 to 1947 Tona exhibited his work in Algeria, Morocco, Tunisia and Paris. His exhibition in the  "Champion-Cordier" gallery in Paris in 1946 was sponsored by Albert Marquet who also gave him lodgings in this studio in La Frette-Montigny.

His work featured in various exhibitions and art shows in Algiers from 1948 to 1960. He received the  "Prix de la critique" in 1950 and the "Prix du Salon de La France d'Outre-Mer" in 1952.
During this time, the Art Museum of Algiers bought several of his paintings.
 
In 1960 Tona returned to live in Paris where the supported himself with his paintings and sculptures. He organised many exhibitions of his work in France and abroad. Several of his paintings where acquired by the Art Museum of Toulouse in 1965 and the National Fund for Contemporary Art in 1980. He died in Paris on 12 February 1987.

Exhibitions 

1940 : Galerie Pompadour, Algiers, Algeria
1943 : Galerie 42, Tunis, Tunisia
1944 : Galerie Paul Colin, Algiers, Algeria
1946 : Galerie Champion-Cordier, Paris, France
1947 : Galerie Française, Casablanca, Morocco
1948 : Galerie Paul Colin, Algiers, Algeria
1950 : Galerie Robert Martin, Oran, Algeria
1951 : Galerie du Livre, Casablanca, Morocco
1952 : Galerie du Nombre d’Or, Algiers, Algeria
1955 : Galerie du Nombre d’Or, Algiers, Algeria
1956 : Galerie du Nombre d’Or, Algiers, Algeria
1957 : Galerie Comte-Tinchant, Algiers, Algeria
1959 : Galerie Comte-Tinchant, Algiers, Algeria
1961 : Galerie 106, Algiers, Algeria
1962 : Galerie Gérard Mourgue à Paris
1962 : Galerie Gérard Mourgue, Paris, France
1963 : Galerie Gérard Mourgue, Paris, France
1964 : Galerie Chedel, Geneva, Switzerland (group exhibition)
1964 : Galerie Sonnegh, Zürich, Switzerland
1964 : Galerie Marc Polony, Paris, France
1965 : Galerie Maurice Oeuillet, Toulouse, France
1966 : Galerie Gérard Mourgue, Paris, France
1968 : Galerie l'Indifférent à Lyon, France
1968 : GSala Rovira, Barcelona, Spain
1969 : Galerie Sainte Croix à Tours, France
1969 : Galerie du Centre, La Baule, France
1970 : Musée Néo-Calédonien, Nouméa, New Caledonia
1971 : Galerie Vauban, Dijon, France
1971 : Galerie Cohen, New York, USA (group exhibition)
1972 : Musée Néo-Calédonien, Nouméa, New Caledonia
1974 : Sala Rovira, Barcelona, Spain
1976 : Galerie des Amis des Arts à Aix-en-Provence, France
1977 : Galerie André Weil, Paris, France
1978 : Galerie des Maîtres Contemporains, Aix-en-Provence, Paris
1980 : Sala Rovira, Barcelona, Spain
1981 : Galerie Agora 3, Sitges, Spain
1982 : Chapelle de la Salpêtrière, Paris, France (group exhibition)
1985 : Galerie de l’Orangerie, Neuchâtel, Switzerland
1996 : Galerie Australe, Nouméa, New Caledonia
2003 : Musée des Beaux Arts de Bordeaux, France (group exhibition featuring l’Ecole d’Alger collection from the Musée National des Beaux Arts d’Alger)
2006 : Musée d’Art et d’Histoire, Narbonne, France (permanent collection)

Sources 

 Elisabeth Cazenave, Les artistes de l'Algérie, Ed. Bernard Giovanangeli, 2001
 Jaume Miratvitlles, Josep Termes, et Carles Fontserè, Carteles de la Republica y de la Guerra Civil, Ed. La Gaya Ciencia, 1978
 Edmon Vallès, Historia grafica de la Catalunya autonoma - La Guerra (1936-1939), Ed. 62, 1978
 Marion Vidal-Bué, Alger et ses peintres, Ed. Paris-Méditerranée, 2000

External links 

 

1903 births
1987 deaths
20th-century Catalan painters
Painters from Barcelona
Spanish expatriates in France
Spanish expatriates in Algeria